Ognjen Mitrović (born 30 June 1999) is a Serbian football player. He plays for Proleter Novi Sad.

Club career
He made his Serbian SuperLiga debut for Proleter Novi Sad on 22 July 2018 in a game against Radnički Niš.

References

External links
 
 Profile at UEFA.com

1999 births
Living people
Serbian footballers
Association football defenders
FK Proleter Novi Sad players
Serbian SuperLiga players